The 2017 New York Giants season was the franchise's 93rd season in the National Football League (NFL), the 8th at MetLife Stadium and the second and final under head coach Ben McAdoo. Coming fresh off an 11–5 season, the Giants hoped to win a Super Bowl and were expected to be playoff contenders by many critics. However, things rapidly fell apart after key injuries and controversial decisions towards the team. An 0–5 start to the season (their second in 5 years), coupled with major injuries to the team, including star wide receiver Odell Beckham Jr., had the Giants suffer a franchise-worst 3–13 record. By Week 10, after losing to the previously winless San Francisco 49ers, the Giants were standing at 1–8, their worst record since 1980. The Giants were eliminated from playoff contention on November 26 with wins by the Atlanta Falcons, Carolina Panthers, and Seattle Seahawks, three days after their own loss to the Washington Redskins.

On November 28, it was announced that Geno Smith would start against the Oakland Raiders in Week 13, which snapped Eli Manning's 210 consecutive games started streak, the longest active streak in the NFL at the time. It started controversy, with present and former teammates, opponents, fans, executives, and television and radio show hosts coming to Manning's defense. The benching of Manning also led to speculation he would possibly join the Jacksonville Jaguars, which would reunite him with former Giants head coach Tom Coughlin, who at the time was Jacksonville's executive vice president of football operations. With the move, the Giants became the last team in the NFL to start an African-American quarterback in at least one game. After losing to the Raiders by a score of 24–17, and with the Giants standing at 2–10, both McAdoo and general manager Jerry Reese were fired, leaving Steve Spagnuolo as the interim head coach and Kevin Abrams as the interim general manager. These were the Giants' first mid-season staff firings since the 1976 season. Manning was then renamed the starter for the Week 14 game against the Cowboys.

A 30–10 loss to the Dallas Cowboys in Week 14 dropped the Giants to 2–11, surpassing the most losses in the Eli Manning era with 10 losses (2004, 2014, and 2015). With a 34-29 loss to the Philadelphia Eagles in Week 15, the Giants tied their single season loss record with 12, and after a 23–0 loss to the Arizona Cardinals in Week 16, the Giants fell to 2–13, setting a new record for most losses in a single season in franchise history, eclipsing the previous record of 12, which had been done six times in franchise history: 1966, 1974, 1980, 1983, 2003 and later in 2019, and the worst under a 16-game schedule format. In their last game, the Giants defeated the Washington Redskins to ultimately finish the season at 3–13.

The Giants' 3–13 record was their worst record in a 16-game season in franchise history, their worst winning percentage since 1974, the worst record in the Eli Manning era, their worst record since 2003, finished last place in the NFC East for the first time since 2003, and second-worst in the league behind the Cleveland Browns. The Giants also went 1–11 against the NFC in 2017 and 1–5 against the NFC East. In the process, the Giants acquired the second pick of the 2018 NFL Draft.

On December 29, 2017, Dave Gettleman was hired as the new general manager for the team. Gettleman quickly address the offensive line issues which led to the release of offensive tackle Bobby Hart and the benching of 2015 1st rounder Ereck Flowers. Flowers started all games to this point being the only consistent starter on the offensive line.

Offseason

Free agents signed

Draft

Notes
 The Giants' original fourth-round selection was moved to the back of the fourth round, after all of the compensatory selections, but no more than 12 picks after where their pick would have been positioned, as part of the punishment for illegal use of a walkie-talkie on their sideline during week 14 of the  season.

Staff

Final roster

Schedule

Preseason

Regular season

Note: Intra-division opponents are in bold text.

Game summaries

Week 1: at Dallas Cowboys
 
Odell Beckham Jr. was declared out before the game due to his ankle injury. The loss of Beckham was too steep for the Giants to overcome who barely mustered 200 yards. The Cowboys set the pace early and were on the field for 47 plays in the first half. The loss dropped the Giants to 0-1. They fell to 1-9 in Week 1 games against the Cowboys, with their only win coming in 2016.

Week 2: vs. Detroit Lions

Even with a limited Odell Beckham Jr., the Giants struggled mightily against the Lions. Rookie tight end Evan Engram scored his first career touchdown. However, an 88-yard punt return touchdown sealed the Giants' fate. With the loss, the Giants dropped to 0-2.

Week 3: at Philadelphia Eagles

Trailing 14-0 entering the 4th quarter, the Giants mounted a huge rally scoring three touchdowns on three consecutive drives, taking a 21-14 lead. However, their rally was overshadowed by rookie kicker Jake Elliott when he kicked a game winning 61-yard field goal to drop the Giants to 0-3 and their fourth straight loss in Philadelphia. It was the longest game winning field goal as time expired since 2006.

Week 4: at Tampa Bay Buccaneers

While Manning led the Giants on a game-leading drive late in the 4th quarter, the defense could not get off the field, and for the second consecutive week, the Giants lost on a game winning field goal to drop to 0-4.

Week 5: vs. Los Angeles Chargers

The Giants suffered a ton of injuries throughout the game including star wide receiver Odell Beckham Jr. It was later revealed he broke his ankle. The Giants blew their third consecutive 4th quarter lead and dropped to 0–5 for the first time since 2013. This was their fourth straight loss to the Chargers as Eli Manning's Giants never beat the team that drafted him 1st overall and sent him to the Giants in exchange for Philip Rivers in the 2004 Draft. The Giants have not beaten the Chargers since 1998.

Week 6: at Denver Broncos

With numerous injuries in the receiving core from the Week 5 game and against a heavily favored Broncos team, the Giants won their first game of the season to snap a 5-game losing streak and defeat the Broncos for the first time since 2005. Janoris Jenkins returned a Trevor Siemian interception for a touchdown in the win, his first as a member of the Giants, and the defense had a goal line stand early in the 4th quarter to seal the game. 

Orleans Darkwa had his first 100-yard game.

Week 7: vs. Seattle Seahawks

This game was the first time the Giants played an intraconference game on CBS since the 1993 season finale against the Dallas Cowboys (before Fox took over the NFC contract in the 1994 season). The Giants defense played well in the first half, aided by an NFL record 10-play goal line stand, but unraveled in the second half as they tired out. They could not be saved by their weak wide receiving corps, along with a struggling run game that sealed their fate. With the loss, the Giants fell to 1-6 and lost to the Seahawks for the fourth straight time.

Week 9: vs. Los Angeles Rams

The Giants started 1-7 for the first time since 1980 with the loss. The Rams dominated the entire game and were aided by a bunch of Giants miscues and three turnovers from the offense. The Giants allowed 51 points, the most points allowed at home since 1964 against the Cleveland Browns. This was their first loss to the Rams since 2001 and their first home loss to the Rams since 2000. After the game, media outlets and sports reporters questioned the efforts of several players, and speculated head coach Ben McAdoo was on the hot seat for losing the Giants locker room.

Despite all the miscues, Eli Manning became the seventh quarterback in NFL history to reach 50,000 career passing yards.

Week 10: at San Francisco 49ers

Attempting to get their second win of the season, the Giants were upset by the previously winless 49ers. Their defense was porous, allowing over 450 yards total offense. Opposing quarterback C. J. Beathard, who entered the game with an 0-4 record and hadn't finished with a passer rating higher than 77, finished with 303 total yards, 3 touchdowns, and a 123.4 passer rating. 

Despite the loss, Eli Manning had his 208th consecutive start at quarterback, tying his brother for 2nd in NFL history.

Eli Manning's first touchdown pass to Evan Engram in the second quarter was the Giants 3,000th regular season touchdown in franchise history.

Week 11: vs. Kansas City Chiefs

Attempting to stop a 3-game losing streak, the Giants returned home to host the Kansas City Chiefs led by Alex Smith and Kareem Hunt. In a defensive battle, the Giants intercepted the Chiefs three times and Roger Lewis made a 4th and 6 catch in the red zone to set up Aldrick Rosas' game-winning field goal in overtime to improve the Giants to 2-8. This was the Giants' first home win of the season.

Eli Manning made his 209th consecutive start at quarterback, passing Peyton Manning for 2nd in NFL history, only trailing Brett Favre (297).

Week 12: at Washington Redskins
NFL on Thanksgiving Day

The Giants offense struggled the entire game and was held to only one first down in the second half. As he would be benched the next week, Eli Manning's streak of 210 consecutive starts by a quarterback ended 2nd in NFL history and is currently 3rd, having since been passed by Philip Rivers.

With the loss, the New York Giants dropped to 2-9. A Seattle Seahawks win over the San Francisco 49ers three days later eliminated the Giants from playoff contention.

Week 13: at Oakland Raiders

For the first time since 2004, Eli Manning did not start the game and was benched in favor of Geno Smith in a moved that was universally panned by the football community. Present and former teammates, opponents, fans, executives, television and radio show hosts quickly came to Manning's defense and the fans revolted. It was also the first time a Manning did not start in an NFL game since Week 17 of the 1997 NFL season. An attempted comeback fell short dropping the Giants to 2-10, their worst record since 1976. Smith completed 21 of 34 passes for 212 yards and one touchdown and lost two redzone fumbles. The following day, the Giants announced that head coach Ben McAdoo and general manager Jerry Reese had been relieved of their duties. Defensive coordinator Steve Spagnuolo took over as the interim head coach and immediately reinstated Manning as the Giants quarterback.

Week 14: vs. Dallas Cowboys

With Eli Manning back in the starting position, both the Giants and Cowboys were tied up at 10 heading into the 4th quarter until Dallas scored 20 unanswered points and shutout the struggling Giants offense to drop the Giants to 2-11. This was the first time the Giants lost more than 10 games in a season since 2003 and first under the Eli Manning era.

Week 15: vs. Philadelphia Eagles

Despite the Giants going up 20-7 at one point, poor special team mishaps and an attempted comeback that fell 6 yards short led the Eagles to win in a thriller of a game to drop the Giants to 2-12, tying their worst record since 1974. Despite their miscues, the Giants dominated on offense going for just under 500 yards and Eli Manning had his best performance this season. With a Washington Redskins' 20-15 win over the Arizona Cardinals, the Giants secured a fourth place finish in the NFC East for the first time since 2003.

The Eagles clinched a first round bye in the victory.

Week 16: at Arizona Cardinals

Shutout for the first time since 2014, the Giants offense could not get into the end zone and their only chance at points came on a missed field goal by Aldrick Rosas. The 2017 Giants became the first and only team in franchise history to lose 13 games in a season until the 2021 team tied this loss record.

Week 17: vs. Washington Redskins
 
In his final game with the Redskins, Kirk Cousins was intercepted and sacked three times each against the Giants defense. The Giants also had a surging run game with over 250 yards on the ground, with Orleans Darkwa set a new career high with 154 yards. The Giants defeated the Redskins 18-10 and finished their season 3-13. With the  Colts beating the Texans that day, the Giants locked in the #2 pick in the 2018 NFL Draft.

This was Steve Spagnuolo's first and only win as the Giants head coach, and their only win against any NFC team during the season, avoiding a division sweep, and avoided finishing winless against NFC teams.

Standings

Division

Conference

References

New York Giants
New York Giants seasons
New York Giants season
21st century in East Rutherford, New Jersey
Meadowlands Sports Complex